Negarestan (also Romanized as Negārestān; also known as Nīārestān, Niaristan, and Niarkistān) is a village in Jushin Rural District, Kharvana District, Varzaqan County, East Azerbaijan Province, Iran. At the 2006 census, its population was 460, in 101 families.

References 

Towns and villages in Varzaqan County